"Keep On Jumpin'" is a song written by musician Patrick Adams and Ken Morris. This track has been remade, remixed, and sampled numerous times, but only the 1978 original by Adams's group Musique and Todd Terry's 1996 updated version with Martha Wash & Jocelyn Brown (who was also a member of Musique) reached number one on Billboard's Hot Dance Club Play charts. Musicians on the tracks include Rich Tannenbaum on drums, Ken Mazur on guitar, and Norbert Sloley on bass. Listed here are the most notable versions.

Original recording by Musique

The original version was recorded in late-1977 by the American disco act Musique, who took it to number one on Billboard's Hot Disco Songs chart as the double-side to "In the Bush", the latter being the act's more popular single. The song crossed over to the urban market and peaked at #81 on the Hot Soul Songs chart. At the time the single was released, there were questions about its lyrics, which made references to drug use even though it was about having a good time partying the night away. The original is still considered a disco classic to this day and was featured on the ABC TV series Family in the 1979 episode "Disco Queen."

Track listing
 US 12" Version, 45 RPM
A. "In the Bush" (8:07)
B. "Keep On Jumpin'" (5:46)

Beatbox version

In 1991, Roger S and Frank Jefferson (AKA Sinister Frank J), under the project name Beatboxx, recorded a techno/house/rave version. This featured a heavy piano beat and fierce female vocals by Chazzie and Paula Brion, over a sampling of Musique's "Keep On Jumpin'" chorus.

Track listing
 12" single (US)
A1. "Keep On Jumpin'" (Subclub Mix) (7:16)
A2. "Keep On Jumpin'" (Egotrip Mix) (6:20)
B1. "Keep On Jumpin'" (N.Y. Club Mix) (6:42)
B2. "Keep On Jumpin'" (Radio Mix) (3:25)

Todd Terry/Martha Wash/Jocelyn Brown version

In 1996, Todd Terry featuring Martha Wash & Jocelyn Brown's version also reached number one on the Hot Dance Club Play. This version was house oriented and the more popular of the "Keep On Jumpin'" versions, based on strength and vocal ability of Wash and Brown alone. This was the first of two back-to-back number ones on Dance Club Play chart for this collaboration between the three artists; their follow-up, "Something Goin' On (In Your Soul)", reached number one in 1997. The song was also featured on Terry's 1997 album Ready for a New Day. In 2017, Wash told about recording the song:

Critical reception
The song was ranked number ten in a list of The Top 10 Dance Tunes Of The '90s for Attitude in 2016. Upon the release, Larry Flick from Billboard commented that "three titans of dance music gather for a positively electric rendition of Musique's disco-era chestnut." He added that Terry "has deftly crafted an arrangement that is sweet enough for popsters but tough enough to keep his longtime club supporters happy. And what can be said of Wash and Brown? These clubland legends don't disappoint in a pairing that shows 'em doing what they do best: vamping and belting with gospel-like vigor. Jump on it." 

William Stevenson from Entertainment Weekly stated that "Keep On Jumpin'" was "nearly as catchy as the "Macarena"" and added that "this confection is certainly bouncy enough to become a staple of aerobics classes." British magazine Music Week rated it three out of five, noting the "sizzling production from Terry", and Wash's "richer-than-treacle vocals". Editor Alan Jones commented, "Terry opts for vocal attack, pairing two of the most popular and enduring disco divas — Martha Wash and Jocelyn Brown — with impressive results." Dave Fowler from Muzik gave it four and a half out of five, describing the song as a "oh-so-perfectly produced package of classic house" that "is sure to keep it pumpin' for lovers of deep Americana on both sides of the pond."

Track listing
 12" promo
A1. "Keep On Jumpin'" (Tee's Freeze Mix) (9:00)
A2. "Keep On Jumpin'" (Tee's JM Mix) (8:10)
B1. "Keep On Jumpin'" (Ken Lou "Jumpin Pumpin" Mix) (6:40)
B2. "Keep On Jumpin'" (Tee's In-House Remix) (5:54)
B3. "Keep On Jumpin'" (Diva's At Work Acapella) (2:25)

 12" Rhythm masters remixes
A1. "Keep On Jumpin'" (Rhythm Masters Vocal Mix) (6:16)
B1. "Keep On Jumpin'" (Rhythm Masters Thumpin' Mix) (6:22)
B2. "Keep On Jumpin'" (Benji Candelario's Key To Dub Mix) (6:09)
      
 CD maxi
"Keep On Jumpin'" (Tee's MT Freeze Radio) (4:02)
"Keep On Jumpin'" (Tee's JM Radio One) (4:02)
"Keep On Jumpin'" (Tee's Freeze Mix) (9:00)
"Keep On Jumpin'" (Tee's JM Mix) (9:00)
"Keep On Jumpin'" (Ken Lou "Jumpin Pumpin" Mix) (6:40)
"Keep On Jumpin'" (Tee's In-House Remix) (5:54)

Charts

Weekly charts

Year-end charts

Lisa Marie Experience version

In late 1995, the UK electronic/house duo The Lisa Marie Experience (a male duo consisting of DJs Neil Hinde & Dean Marriott) recorded a version, which after success in the clubs was officially released in early 1996 and was a number seven hit in the UK. For the white label they sampled Musique's original recording from 1977, but couldn't get clearance for the sample so had to recreate it. "Keep On Jumpin'" was released on the FFRR record label and was the only top 10 hit for the Lisa Marie Experience in the UK. In the US, it peaked at number three on the Hot Dance Club Play chart.

Critical reception
Pan-European magazine Music & Media wrote, "The Lisa Marie Experience Going back to Lipps Inc's Funky Town but without that unforgettable rhythm guitar, that's the feeling you get from this updated "disco-inferno" with cheeky girls and wild strings." A reviewer from Music Week rated the song four out of five, adding, "Massive on the club scene, this bubbling house anthem is predicted to bump and hustle its way to chart success, morphing from the underground track to household staple a la Josh Wink." Andy Beevers from the magazine's RM Dance Update gave it five out of five, noting that "their pumping house intro gives way to a guitar breakdown before the full-on disco pressure takes hold with Chris Wiltshire's infectious vocals vying for attention with those classic strings stabs."

Track listing
 CD maxi-single (US/UK)
"Keep On Jumpin'" (Bizarre Inc Remix Edit) – 4:02
"Keep On Jumpin'" (Bizarre Inc Remix) – 7:38
"Keep On Jumpin'" (The Lisa Marie Vocal Experience) – 8:00
"Keep On Jumpin'" (The Lisa Marie Sequential Dub) – 7:39
"Keep On Jumpin'" (The Lisa Marie Sequential) – 8:17

Charts

Weekly charts

Year-end charts

Corenell version

In 2007, German electronic/house remixer Corenell remixed The Lisa Marie Experience's version, which became a top 20 UK hit under the credited "Corenell vs Lisa Marie Experience". The success of the 2007 track may have been fueled by its accompanying video, which featured rival women teams playing soccer in the mud, the women become more sexually explicit as they played. The uncensored video is included in the CD maxi-single.

Track listing
 CD maxi-single (UK)
"Keep On Jumpin'" (Corenell Radio Edit) (2:49)
"Keep On Jumpin'" (The Lisa Marie Experience 2007 Radio Edit) (2:56)
"Keep On Jumpin'" (Corenell Extended Mix) (7:13)
"Keep On Jumpin'" (The Lisa Marie Experience 2007 Remix) (7:44)
"Keep On Jumpin'" (Fonzerelli Remix) (6:43)
"Keep On Jumpin'" (Electro Mix) (6:49)
Bonus Video: "Keep On Jumpin'" (Uncensored)

References

External links
Musique's original version
Beatboxx's Sunclub remix
Cornell vs. Lisa Marie Experience video clip
Todd Terry/Martha Wash/Joelyn Brown video clip

1978 singles
1992 singles
1996 singles
2007 singles
Disco songs
House music songs
Jocelyn Brown songs
Martha Wash songs
Todd Terry songs
FFRR Records singles
Logic Records singles
Prelude Records (record label) singles
RCA Records singles
Ultra Music singles
1978 songs
Songs written by Patrick Adams (musician)